Kemper is an American insurance provider with corporate headquarters located in Chicago, Illinois. With nearly $15 billion in assets, the Kemper family of companies provide insurance to individuals, families, and businesses.

History
Kemper Corporation was originally founded as Unitrin, Inc. in April 1990, when it spun off from Henry Singleton's conglomerate Teledyne. Singleton expected the new venture to duplicate the successful spin off of the Argo Group, originally a workers’ compensation insurance provider, created in 1986. Argonaut's original $20 per share stock appreciated 240 percent by 1990. Singleton remained Chairman of Unitrin after it was spun off to shareholders at $31.25 per share, trading on NASDAQ. Unitrin divided its business into three major categories: life and health insurance, property and casualty insurance, and consumer finance, which covered a variety of services including automobile and industrial loans.

In 2002, Unitrin purchased the renewal rights for the homeowners and automobile insurance lines of Kemper Insurance, a long-time Chicago insurance and financial services firm.

In 2010, Unitrin purchased all rights to the Kemper name, and began operations as Kemper Corporation on August 25, 2011, with trading on the New York Stock Exchange under the KMPR ticker symbol.

In November 2015, Joseph P. Lacher, Jr. was appointed President and Chief Executive Officer.

The company unified and refreshed its brand in October 2018.

Fortune Magazine included Kemper on its 2020 list of the 100 Fastest-Growing Companies.

In May 2020, Joseph P. Lacher, Jr. was elected Chairman of the Board, in addition to his role as President and Chief Executive Officer.

On November 23, 2020, the company announced it had entered into a definitive agreement to acquire American Access Casualty Company and its related captive insurance agency, Newins Insurance Agency Holdings, LLC, and its subsidiaries (collectively “AAC”), in a cash transaction valued at $370 million.  On April 1, 2021, the company announced it had completed the acquisition of AAC. AAC provided specialty private passenger auto insurance in Arizona, Illinois, Indiana, Nevada and Texas.

The Kemper Open was a professional golf tournament on the PGA Tour for 35 years, from 1968 through 2002.

Acquisitions
In April 2015, Kemper acquired Alliance United Insurance Company, one of the fastest growing auto insurance providers in the State of California. Source:

In July 2018, Kemper acquired Infinity Property and Casualty Corporation (NASDAQ: IPCC), an auto insurance provider focused on serving the specialty, nonstandard segment, in a cash and stock transaction valued at approximately $1.4 billion.

In April 2021, Kemper completed the acquisition of Downers Grove, Illinois based American Access Casualty Company. American Access Casualty Company specializes in automobile insurance directed towards the Hispanic community.

Subsidiaries

Kemper Property & Casualty

Kemper’s Property & Casualty Insurance segment includes the following businesses:

 Kemper Auto is a national provider of auto insurance with a concentration on non-standard auto insurance
 Infinity, a Kemper Company is a provider of non-standard auto insurance for drivers in the State of California only
 Kemper Personal Insurance provides both home and auto insurance to the company’s preferred/standard book of business

Property & Casualty Insurance Companies
 Alpha Property & Casualty Insurance Company
 Alliance United Insurance Company
 Charter Indemnity Company
 Financial Indemnity Company
 Infinity Insurance Company
 Infinity Auto Insurance Company
 Infinity Assurance Insurance Company
 Infinity Casualty Insurance Company
 Infinity County Mutual Insurance Company
 Infinity Indemnity Insurance Company
 Infinity Preferred Insurance Company
 Infinity Safeguard Insurance Company
 Infinity Select Insurance Company
 Infinity Standard Insurance Company
 Infinity Security Insurance Company
 Kemper Financial Indemnity Company
 Kemper Independence Insurance
 Merastar Insurance Company
 Mutual Savings Fire Insurance Company
 Response Insurance Company
 Response Worldwide Direct Auto Insurance Company
 Response Worldwide Insurance Company
 Trinity Universal Insurance Company
 Unitrin Advantage Insurance Company
 Unitrin Auto and Home Insurance Company
 Unitrin Direct Insurance Company
 Unitrin Direct Property & Casualty Company
 Unitrin Preferred Insurance Company
 Unitrin Safeguard Insurance Company
 Valley Property & Casualty Insurance Company
 Warner Insurance Company

Kemper Life & Kemper Health

Kemper’s Life & Health insurance segment is made up of the following businesses:

 Kemper Life
 Kemper Health
 Kemper’s Reserve National business offers hospital, surgical, accident, supplemental, specified disease, and life insurance plans.

Life & Health Insurance Companies
 Mutual Savings Fire Insurance Company
 Mutual Savings Life Insurance Company
 Reserve National Insurance Company
 The Reliable Life Insurance Company
 Union National Life Insurance Companresearch department
 United Insurance Company of America
 United Casualty Insurance Company of America
 Union National Fire Insurance Company

Other Affiliated Insurance Companies
 Capitol County Mutual Fire Insurance Company
 Old Reliable Casualty Company
 Unitrin County Mutual Insurance Company

References

Companies based in Chicago
Financial services companies established in 1990
Companies formerly listed on the Nasdaq
Companies listed on the New York Stock Exchange
Insurance companies of the United States
Insurance companies based in Illinois